Estadio Nueva Espana is a multi-use stadium in Buenos Aires, Argentina, it has a capacity of 32,500 and it was built in 1981.

Nueva España was used as the home ground of Deportivo Español, a football club who currently play in Primera B Metropolitana which is the Argentine third division. Due to the clubs recent financial difficulties, and the poor condition of the stadium, they were prevented from playing there, and had to play their home games elsewhere. However, at the start of the 2007/08 season, Español came back home after four years, playing against Deportivo Armenio on August 12.

External links

Deportivo Español
N